Temple robes describe the ceremonial clothing worn in the performance of ordinances and ceremonies in a temple.

Buddhist tradition 

Traditional robes, worn by monks both within and without Buddhist temples, appear in a variety of configurations. In parts of Southeast Asia, the robes consist of a saffron-colored mantel over a red undergarment. In Japan, the robe is traditionally black, grey or blue.

Hebrew Bible tradition 
The 28th and 29th chapters of the Book of Exodus describe in detail the ritual clothing worn by priests in the Temple. The robes consist of a breastplate (hoshen), an ephod, a robe (me'il), a tunic (ketonet), a cap (mitznefet), and a sash (avnet), as well as stones worn in various configurations.

Latter Day Saint tradition 

Members of the Church of Jesus Christ of Latter-day Saints (LDS Church) and certain Mormon fundamentalists wear ceremonial robes to perform the endowment and sealing portions of their temple ceremonies. The ceremonial robes are modeled after those described in the Bible according to latter-day revelation. The clothing includes a robe that fits over one shoulder, a sash, an apron, a veil (for women), and a cap (for men). All of the clothing is white, including shoes and neckties, except for the apron, which is green. It is common for Latter-day Saints to be buried with the body dressed in their temple clothes.

This outer temple clothing is distinct from the temple garments worn every day as underwear by Latter-day Saints after they have received an endowment in the temple.

See also 
 Vestment liturgical garments

References

External links 
 Exodus 28-29
 Discussion of LDS temple clothing
 Buddhist Ceremonies by Buddhist Monks At The Shaolin Temple

Buddhist religious clothing
Jewish religious clothing
Latter Day Saint religious clothing
Latter Day Saint temple practices
Robes and cloaks